Team Jumbo–Visma may refer to:

Team Jumbo–Visma (men's team), a professional cycling team that competes on the UCI World Tour
Team Jumbo–Visma (women's team), a professional cycling team that is due to compete in women's cycling from 2021
Jumbo–Visma Development Team, a developmental cycling team that started competing from the 2020 season